Pedicularis rostratocapitata is a species of flowering plant in the family Orobanchaceae commonly known as long-nosed lousewort. It is endemic to the Alps.

References

rostratocapitata